Kara Solmundson  (born 20 July 1975) is a Canadian badminton player. She played for the Manitoba team and clinched the women's singles national champion in 2002. She represented Canada at the 2000 Summer Olympics and 2002 Commonwealth Games. Solmundson was the bronze medallist at the 1999 Pan American Games in the women's singles event.

Personal life
Solmundson graduated from the Kelvin High School in her hometown Winnipeg, Manitoba in 1992. She then continued her education in University of Manitoba and received Medical Doctor degree. Following the conclusion of family medicine residency at University of British Columbia, she completed a clinical sport and exercise medicine fellowship through UBC and earned a Canadian Academy of Sport and Exercise Medicine diploma. She also pursuing her master's degree in the field of Sports and Exercise Medicine. Solmundson now work as a physician at the Allan McGavin Sports Medicine Centre.

Achievements

Pan American Games
Women's singles

Pan Am Championships
Wome's singles

Mixed doubles

IBF International
Women's singles

Women's doubles

Mixed doubles

References

External links
 
 

1974 births
Living people
Sportspeople from Winnipeg
University of Manitoba alumni
Physicians from Manitoba
Canadian female badminton players
Olympic badminton players of Canada
Badminton players at the 2000 Summer Olympics
Commonwealth Games competitors for Canada
Badminton players at the 2002 Commonwealth Games
Badminton players at the 1999 Pan American Games
Pan American Games bronze medalists for Canada
Pan American Games medalists in badminton
Medalists at the 1999 Pan American Games